Qaleh-ye Ashna Khvor (also Romanized as Qal‘eh-ye Āshnā Khvor; also known as Qal‘eh) is a village in Ashna Khvor Rural District, in the Central District of Khomeyn County, Markazi Province, Iran. At the 2006 census, its population was 226, in 56 families.

References 

Populated places in Khomeyn County